Government Higher Secondary School Kurunikulathupatti is a government school in Kurunikulathupatti. It is located near Palayam. The school enrolled 650 students in 2015, and employed 32 teachers. The school has a pakka building, playground, library, medical facilities, and lab facilities (computer lab, chemistry lab, physics lab, and biology lab).

References

High schools and secondary schools in Tamil Nadu